Florent Krzakala (born  in Nancy, France) is a French physicist and applied mathematician, currently a professor at EPFL (École Polytechnique Fédérale de Lausanne). His research focuses on the resolution of theoretical problems in physics, computer science, machine learning, statistics and signal processing using mathematical tools inspired by the field of statistical physics.

Education and career 
Florent Krzakala grew up in Marseille, France, where he studied at the Lycée Saint-Exupéry and Aix-Marseille University, and then moved to Paris for his graduate studies. After a master's degree in particle physics, he switched field to statistical physics for his PhD, which he obtained in 2002 jointly from the Pierre and Marie Curie University and the Paris-Sud University under the supervision of Prof. Olivier Martin in the Laboratory of Theoretical Physics and Statistical Models in Orsay, where he also collaborated with Prof. Marc Mézard. His doctoral work focused on the thermodynamics of disordered systems and spin glasses.

He then moved to the Sapienza University of Rome as a postdoctoral researcher, where he studied various statistical physics topics such as glassy systems, Monte-Carlo simulation techniques, and out-of-equilibrium dynamics in the laboratory of Prof. Giorgio Parisi. In 2004, he was named associate professor at ESPCI Paris, in the laboratoire Gulliver. In 2013, he became full professor at the Pierre and Marie Curie University and the École Normale Supérieure in Paris, and joined the physics laboratory in Ecole Normale Supérieure.

In September 2020, he was appointed Full Professor of Electrical Engineering and of Physics at EPFL, where he founded the laboratoire IdePHICS.

He has also held various visiting positions at the Los Alamos National Laboratory, University of California in Berkeley, at Duke University, and in the Kavli Institute for Theoretical Physics at the University of California, Santa Barbara.

Research 
Florent Krzakala heads the laboratory for Information, Learning and Physics (IdePHICS) at the School of Basic Sciences and the School of Engineering of EPFL.

Trained as a theoretical statistical physicist, Florent Krzakala studied problems involving complex assemblies of simple elementary components, especially in the context of spin glasses and disordered systems. His attention has then switched to computer sciences, statistics and applied mathematics, where conceptually similar problems often arise and can be solved with similar techniques. He has notably worked in random combinatorial optimization, coding and information theory, statistical inference, machine learning and compressed sensing. He is especially known for his work on the Stochastic block model, Quantum annealing and on phase transitions in satisfiability and colouring with the Cavity method.

The work of Florent Krzakala and colleagues has led to the creation of French startup LightOn, which develops optic-based hardware, outperforming traditional silicium-based processors in data processing for artificial intelligence applications.

Recognition
Florent Krzakala was named a junior fellow of the Institut Universitaire de France in 2015. He received a grant from the European Research Council for his work on compressed sensing in 2012. He received the Atos-Fourier price in 2018 . He was the holder of the CFM chair in data-science in Ecole Normale Supérieure from 2016 to 2020.

Notable publications

References

External links 

 Florent Krzakala's personal homepage.
 
 

1976 births
Living people
Academic staff of the École Polytechnique Fédérale de Lausanne
French physicists
Aix-Marseille University alumni
Academic staff of the Sapienza University of Rome
Academic staff of ESPCI Paris
Academic staff of Pierre and Marie Curie University
Academic staff of the École Normale Supérieure